Reise ins Ehebett is an East German film. It was released in 1966 and featured the first film appearance by pop singer Frank Schöbel.

References

External links
 

1966 films
East German films
1960s German-language films
1960s German films